Ruben R. "RJ" Nembhard Jr. (born March 22, 1999) is an American professional basketball player for Fos Provence Basket of the LNB Pro A in France. He played college basketball for the TCU Horned Frogs.

Early life and high school career
Nembhard grew up playing football and started playing basketball at age 10. He attended Keller High School in Keller, Texas. Nembhard averaged 21 points as a junior, earning District 5-6A MVP honors. In his senior season, he averaged 25.7 points, 6.5 rebounds and 3.2 assists per game. Nembhard was named Star-Telegram Super Team Player of the Year and District 3-6A MVP. A four-star recruit, he committed to playing college basketball for TCU over offers from Texas, Oklahoma, Kansas State and Baylor.

College career
Nembhard redshirted his first season at TCU after receiving limited playing time through six games and suffering a knee injury. As a freshman, he came off the bench, averaging 4.4 points and 2.1 rebounds per game. On January 4, 2020, he scored a career-high 31 points in an 81–79 overtime win over Iowa State. As a sophomore, Nembhard averaged 12.1 points, 3.8 rebounds and 3.5 assists per game. As a junior, he averaged 15.7 points, 4.3 rebounds and four assists per game, earning Third Team All-Big 12 honors. On March 29, 2021, Nembhard declared for the 2021 NBA draft while maintaining his college eligibility. He later decided to remain in the draft.

Professional career

Cleveland Cavaliers (2021–2022)
After going undrafted in the 2021 NBA draft, Nembhard joined the Miami Heat for the 2021 NBA Summer League. On September 27, 2021, he signed with the Cleveland Cavaliers. On October 16, his deal was converted to a two-way contract with the Cleveland Charge of the NBA G League. On March 31, 2022, he signed a standard contract with the Cavaliers. On April 7, he was waived by the Cavaliers and three days later, he signed another two-way contract with the Cleveland Cavaliers.

Motor City Cruise (2022)
On November 9, 2022, the Motor City Cruise announced via their Twitter account that they had acquired Nembhard.

Pallacanestro Reggiana (2022–2023)
On December 12, 2022, he signed with Pallacanestro Reggiana of the Lega Basket Serie A.

Fos Provence Basket (2023–present)
On January 19, 2023, he signed with Fos Provence Basket of the LNB Pro A.

Career statistics

NBA

|-
| style="text-align:left;"| 
| style="text-align:left;"| Cleveland
| 14 || 0 || 4.5 || .333 || .000 || .750 || .5 || .9 || .1 || .0 || 1.1
|- class="sortbottom"
| style="text-align:center;" colspan="2"|Career
| 14 || 0 || 4.5 || .333 || .000 || .750 || .5 || .9 || .1 || .0 || 1.1

College

|-
| style="text-align:left;"| 2017–18
| style="text-align:left;"| TCU
| 6 || 0 || 5.5 || .286 || .000 || .250 || 1.0 || .8 || .0 || .2 || 1.5
|-
| style="text-align:left;"| 2018–19
| style="text-align:left;"| TCU
| 36 || 8 || 17.2 || .351 || .299 || .615 || 2.1 || .9 || .5 || .4 || 4.4
|-
| style="text-align:left;"| 2019–20
| style="text-align:left;"| TCU
| 29 || 28 || 32.1 || .366 || .313 || .740 || 3.8 || 3.5 || 1.0 || .2 || 12.1
|-
| style="text-align:left;"| 2020–21
| style="text-align:left;"| TCU
| 24 || 24 || 34.9 || .400 || .339 || .778 || 4.3 || 4.0 || 1.1 || .2 || 15.7
|- class="sortbottom"
| style="text-align:center;" colspan="2"| Career
| 95 || 60 || 25.5 || .375 || .314 || .724 || 3.1 || 2.5 || .8 || .3 || 9.4

Personal life
Son of Ruben & Terri Nembhard. Nembhard's father, Ruben, played one season in the NBA/15 seasons overseas and works as a trainer and skills development coach. His grandfather,  Joe Beauchamp played 10 seasons with the San Diego Chargers and his sister, Jayden, plays volleyball for Long Beach State.

References

External links
TCU Horned Frogs bio

1999 births
Living people
American men's basketball players
Basketball players from Texas
Cleveland Cavaliers players
Cleveland Charge players
Fos Provence Basket players
People from Keller, Texas
Point guards
Shooting guards
Sportspeople from the Dallas–Fort Worth metroplex
TCU Horned Frogs men's basketball players
Undrafted National Basketball Association players